The London, Midland and Scottish Railway (LMS) Fowler Dock Tank was an  steam locomotive. Designed for shunting in docks, it had a short wheelbase in order for it to readily negotiate tight curves. The locomotives spent their entire lives painted in plain black.

History
The LMS were responsible for operating lines on a number of docks which, due to space constraints, contained curves considerably sharper than most other places, thus most dock tanks had only four coupled (i.e. driving) wheels in order to allow them to negotiate the tight curves.

Design
With the growth in freight a more powerful engine was required which resulted in this design by Sir Henry Fowler for an  locomotive with a  wheelbase which, aided by the use of Cartazzi self-centring axleboxes on the rear axle, allowed the loco to negotiate curves of 2½ chains.

Construction
Ten of these simple sturdy locomotives were built on Lot 61 in 1928 and 1929 by Derby Works although, unusually for dock tanks they incorporated outside cylinders, these normally being considered too dangerous in an area where people were working close to the rapidly moving rods. Other than this they were typical of most dock tanks with simple slide valves and oval buffers.

Numbering
They were initially numbered 11270–11279, renumbered under the LMS 1933 renumbering scheme to 7100–7109, and renumbered again in 1939 to 7160–7169.  Despite their small quantity, the LMS considered them standard locomotives. After nationalisation in 1948, BR added 40000 to their numbers making them 47160–47169, and allocated 5 of the 10 to Scottish depots, where they operated on branch lines as well as docks.

Withdrawal
Withdrawals took place between 1959 and 1964 with none surviving into preservation.

References

0-6-0T locomotives
2 Fowler Dock Tank
Railway locomotives introduced in 1928
Scrapped locomotives
Standard gauge steam locomotives of Great Britain
Shunting locomotives